The action off Lofoten was a naval battle fought between the German Kriegsmarine and the British Royal Navy off the southern coast of the Lofoten Islands, Norway during World War II. A German squadron under Vizeadmiral Günther Lütjens consisting of the battleships  and  met and engaged a British squadron under Admiral Sir William Whitworth consisting of the battlecruiser  and nine destroyers. After a short engagement, Gneisenau suffered moderate damage and the Germans withdrew.

Background
The German invasion of Norway, Operation Weserübung, began on 9 April 1940. In order to prevent any disruption of the invasion by the British, the Kriegsmarine had previously dispatched a force under Vice Admiral Günther Lütjens to protect the troop convoy landing at Narvik. The German squadron consisted of the battleships Scharnhorst and Gneisenau, the heavy cruiser , and ten destroyers. With intelligence suggesting that the Germans were massing ships, the British sent out a squadron under Admiral Sir William Whitworth to deny German access to neutral Norwegian waters by laying mines in Operation Wilfred and prevent any German naval movements into the Atlantic Ocean.

Shortly after departing German waters on 7 April, Lütjens' force was attacked by British bombers which did no damage to the squadron. On 8 April, Admiral Hipper and the German destroyers were dispatched to Narvik while the German capital ships headed north for a diversionary manoeuvre into the North Atlantic. As Admiral Hipper left, she met and engaged the British destroyer  which had become separated from Admiral Whitworth's main force. Though Vizeadmiral Lütjens—and the two German battleships—was nearby, their assistance was deemed unnecessary, and Admiral Hipper sank Glowworm, though taking some damage in return. Whitworth's main force then caught sight of Scharnhorst and Gneisenau at 03:30 on 9 April and moved to engage the battleships.

Whitworth's force consisted of the battlecruiser Renown and the nine remaining destroyers. Renown had been completely reconstructed between 1936 and 1939, with lighter machinery, increased armour and upgraded armament. She mounted a main battery of six 42-calibre 15-inch guns with improved shells and greater range and a dual-purpose secondary battery consisting of twenty 4.5-inch (QF 4.5 inch L/45) guns arranged in ten turrets. The four I and E-class destroyers had been rigged for mine laying and most of their normal armament had been removed; they only had two  guns each. Greyhound and the H-class destroyers were more capable ships, each armed with eight torpedo tubes and four 4.7-inch guns. Of the H-class destroyers, Hardy was built as a destroyer leader and thus had an additional 4.7-inch gun.

The German force consisted of the two Scharnhorst-class battleships, each with a main battery of nine 28.3 cm guns and a secondary battery of twelve 15 cm guns. In a close range engagement, the British force was superior, but at a distance the guns on Whitworth's destroyers were outranged and the German firepower was greater. Thus, Lütjens clearly held an advantage over Renown, though the German force was significantly vulnerable to attack from Whitworth′s destroyers.

Battle
At 03:50, Gneisenau sighted Renown on its radar (but failed to identify her) and the German ships cleared for action. Due to poor weather conditions, neither side was able to engage the other until 04:05, as heavy seas and poor visibility prevented the two squadrons from closing within range. Renown began the action by attacking Gneisenau with her 15-inch guns. The German warships returned fire at 04:11 with Gneisenau scoring two hits on Renown with her 11-inch shells. Both shells failed to explode, with the first hitting the British battlecruiser's foremast and the second passing through the ship near the steering gear room. About the same time, Renown struck Gneisenau with two shells, with a third a little later. These hits damaged the German battleship's director tower, forward range finders, and aft turret putting it out of action, a port anti-aircraft gun was also hit. Renown then moved her fire to Scharnhorst, which had moved to hide Gneisenau with smoke. Both German ships suffered damage from the heavy seas as they sought to avoid Renowns fire and both suffered serious electrical problems in their turrets as a result, resulting in poor output from their guns. Renown also suffered some damage to her starboard bulge from the rough seas and firing of her guns, limiting speed. These early salvos were sporadic and lasted until 05:00, when the engagement was broken off for 20 minutes due to waves breaking over Renowns forward turrets as the German ships headed directly into the storm to escape. By this time Renowns destroyer escort had fallen back due to the severe weather and Scharnhorst started to suffer radar problems at about 04.20.

At 05:20, the action reignited, with ineffectual fire coming from both sides. With both ships damaged by their speed through the storm, Gneisenau missing a turret and Scharnhorsts radar out of action, as well as fearing a torpedo attack on the damaged Gneisenau, the Germans increased their speed and disengaged at 06:15. The Germans mistook Whitworth's smaller vessels for much more powerful capital ships and as a result thought they were heavily outgunned. Damaged and determined to steer clear of what he thought was a superior force, Lütjens managed to shake off the British squadron and end the action by sailing west into the Arctic Ocean. With her damaged bulge and the problems of firing forwards into a storm Renown was forced to break off the search, instead moving to cut off the ships should they turn round.

Renown fired 230 15-inch and 1065 4.5-inch rounds during the action, while Scharnhorst fired 182 11-inch rounds and Gneisenau only managed to fire 54 11-inch rounds.

Aftermath
Despite the Royal Navy winning a minor tactical victory over the Kriegsmarine, the Germans considered the engagement a strategic success due to the fact that Whitworth's force was delayed long enough to keep it from interfering with the landings at Narvik. After the action had ended, Whitworth's force continued to search for the German capital ships. With the British squadron occupied, the German destroyer-transports managed to make their way through to Narvik after destroying two Norwegian coastal defence ships in their path. After their engagement with Renown, the German battleships linked up with Admiral Hipper on the 11th near Trondheim. From there, they returned to Germany, reaching Wilhelmshaven on 12 April where the battle and weather damage to Scharnhorst and Gneisenau was repaired.

See also 

 List of Kriegsmarine ships
 List of classes of British ships of World War II

Citations

References
 
 
 
 
 
 
 
 Smith, Peter C (2008) The Battle-Cruiser HMS Renown 1916-48. Barnsley: Pen and Sword Maritime.  .

Naval battles and operations of the European theatre of World War II
Naval battles of World War II involving Germany
Lofoten
Conflicts in 1940
1940 in Norway
1940 in Germany
1940 in the United Kingdom
Action off Lofoten
Norwegian campaign
April 1940 events